Spook Louder is a 1943 short subject directed by Del Lord starring American slapstick comedy team The Three Stooges (Moe Howard, Larry Fine and Curly Howard). It is the 69th entry in the series released by Columbia Pictures starring the comedians, who released 190 shorts for the studio between 1934 and 1959.

Plot
Spook Louder is told in flashback by Professor J.O. Dunkfeather (Lew Kelly) in an interview with a newspaper reporter (Stanley Brown). The Professor relates to the reporter the story of Graves, the master spy (Ted Lorch). As the tale begins, we see the Three Stooges as traveling salesmen, trying their best to sell their "Miracle Reducing Machine", which essentially shakes and rattles off the pounds (as Curly demonstrates). Upon failing to sell any of their machines, they trudge onward, needing money to pay their rent. As luck would have it, the boys stumble upon the home of Graves, who assumes the Stooges are the new caretakers. Graves is on his way to Washington, D.C. to test his new death ray machine, and leaves his eerie, spooky mansion in the hands of the trio. Naturally, spies disguised in Halloween costumes show up once Graves departs. The Stooges are on edge the entire time, particularly because mysterious cream pies continuously come flying out of thin air thrown by a mysterious pie-throwing spirit (whoever he/she is). After being cornered by the spies, the Stooges detonate a bomb given to them by Graves before he departed; they end up subduing the thieves, thus assuring that Graves' secrets remain in good hands.

Back in the office, the reporter is desperate to know who was throwing the cream pies. Dunkfeather confesses that he was throwing the pies in the home of Graves; however, this claim is compromised when, out of nowhere, a pie flies into his face.

Production notes
The title Spook Louder is a pun combining the request "speak louder" with the "spooks" of a mansion. It is a remake of the 1931 Mack Sennett film The Great Pie Mystery.

Co-stars Charles Middleton and Ted Lorch also appeared together in the 1936 serial Flash Gordon. This was Middleton's only appearance in a Stooge short.

Filmed on July 17–21, 1942, Spook Louder was one of several World War II-era Stooges shorts that engaged in propaganda against the then-enemy Japanese, with others including No Dough Boys, Booby Dupes and, notably, The Yoke's on Me.

Reception
The Stooge films released between 1942-1944 were considered to be a step down in quality from previous entries made between 1935-1941. Spook Louder, in particular, was singled out by author Ted Okuda as "their worst picture in some time. The story of a phantom pie-thrower is a repetitious one-joke affair devoid of laughs."

In popular culture
Several scenes from Spook Louder appear in the 1992 film Radio Flyer.

References

External links 
 
 
 Spook Louder at threestooges.net

1943 films
The Three Stooges films
American black-and-white films
Cultural depictions of Adolf Hitler
American World War II films
Films directed by Del Lord
Columbia Pictures short films
American comedy mystery films
1940s comedy mystery films
1943 comedy films
1940s English-language films
1940s American films